Bakhtiaruyeh (also Romanized as Bakhtīārūyeh; also known as Bakhteyār, Bakhteyārū, and Bakhtīārī) is a village in Banaruiyeh Rural District, Banaruiyeh District, Larestan County, Fars Province, Iran. At the 2006 census, its population was 243, in 63 families.

References 

Populated places in Larestan County